Jivani (1846–1909), born Serob Stepani Levonian (also known as Serovbe Stepani Benkoyan), was an Armenian ashugh (bard) and poet.

History
Jivani was born in Kartsakhi, near Akhalkalaki, Georgia. He became an orphan when he was 8, his uncle looked after him. He learned music composition and performance on kemanche and violin with the support of master Ghara-Ghazar. In 1866 along with gusan Sazain (Aghajan) Jivani moved to Tbilisi, where he continued his musical activities. The further development of Jivani's art is connected to Alexandropol (Gyumri) and its musical culture. He lived and worked there in 1868–1895. In Alexandropol he headed a circle of fellow gusan-singers, and was awarded by the honorary title of ustabashi (leading master). Jivani had concerts all over Transcaucasia, including Batumi, Baku, Kars and Tbilisi. In 1895, he returned to Tbilisi.

Jivani was an author of more than 800 songs, written in romantic, ironical or realistic styles. He had the good knowledge of 19th century Armenian literature, and was influenced by it. He used clear forms of Armenian language, avoided of foreign transliterations. His songs were mainly devoted to the problems of social protest, poverty and lawlessness ("The Life in the Village", "Worker", etc.). In his songs Jivani condemned oppressors, represented the struggle of Armenian people against foreign rule, sang about the brotherhood of people. Many of Jivani's songs ("The Unhappy Days", "Mother", "At this night", "A good comrade", "I am an apricot tree", "Look at them") became popular.

The first compilation of Jivani's poems was published in 1885. His music was performed or used by Kristapor Kara-Murza, Komitas Vardapet, Aram Khachaturian, and many others, Maxim Gorky and Valery Bryusov were interested in his poetry. He is recognized as the "greatest Armenian ashugh of the 19th century".

References

External links
 Djivan's Poems (translated by Alice Stone Blackwell)
 Jivani at Armeniapedia

1846 births
1909 deaths
People from Samtskhe–Javakheti
People from Tiflis Governorate
Georgian people of Armenian descent
19th-century Armenian poets
Armenian composers
Burials at Armenian Pantheon of Tbilisi
Armenian male poets
19th-century male writers
19th-century Armenian male singers
Armenian people from the Russian Empire